Lee Mao-san (born 11 April 1960) is a Taiwanese singer and television host.

At 19, Lee won first place in a singing competition in 1979. He released his debut album in 1984. Lee won a Golden Melody Award in 1991, followed by a Golden Bell Award in 1993. He left Taiwan in 1999, to avoid gambling debts, and settled in Malaysia and Singapore.

References

1960 births
Living people
Taiwanese Mandopop singer-songwriters
Taiwanese Hokkien pop singers
20th-century Taiwanese male singers
Taiwanese expatriates in Malaysia
Taiwanese expatriates in Singapore
Taiwanese television presenters